Troškūnai is the second smallest city in Lithuania.

History

Troškūnai first mentioned in historical sources in 1506, the estate of Troškūnai (or estate of Smėlynė) existed in 16th century. Troškūnai became a town in the 17th-18th centuries when the church of St Trinity Church and Bernardine Monastery in the style of late baroque according to the project of the architect Martin Knakfus were built. In 1698 Troškūnai got a privilege to organise markets. The Bernardine monastery became an important center of cultural life. The monks were active in resistance against the Russian tsarist regime.

In 1773 the school in which children of noblemen, town dwellers and local peasants were educated. In 1781 20 children from peasant families, 4 children from Troškūnai and 8 children from nobleman families attended lessons. The building of the school (1796) survives up to this day.

The birthplace of Lithuanian lexicographer and writer Konstantinas Sirvydas is nearby the city. The city was established in 1696 by Władysław Sokołowski, who brought there Bernardines, founded a church and a monastery. Recently the buildings were returned to the Bernardine monks, who established the International Centre of Youth there.

On 22 November in 1920 during Lithuanian Wars of Independence in fight against Polish cavalry, perished Lithuanian riflemen Jonas Budrevičius (1900–1920), Petras Liktoras (1903–1920), Antanas Miškeliūnas (1901–1920), Petras Tunkevičius (1902–1920), Antanas Žarskus (1895–1920).

On July 10, 1941, local Lithuanian collaborators killed 8 or 9 Jewish men on the premises of the local school. In mid-July 1941 5-6 Jewish men were shot at the Jewish cemetery by Troškūnai members of the Lithuanian Activist Front.
In August, 1941, the remaining Jews of Troškūnai (about 200 people) were transported by white armbanders to the Panevėžys ghetto. There on August 23, 1941, they were murdered along with Jews from the city of Panevėžys and its surrounding areas in a mass execution.

After the Soviet occupation in the surroundings of Troškūnai Lithuanian partisans of Algimantas military district Šarūnas detachment were active.

Gallery

References

External links
 Troškūnai (Trashkun), a small shtetl in Lithuania - JewishGen KehilaLink for Troškūnai

Cities in Lithuania
Cities in Utena County
Vilkomirsky Uyezd
Holocaust locations in Lithuania
Anykščiai District Municipality